The Neuquén Group is a group of geologic formations found in Argentina. Rocks in the Neuquén Group fall within the Cenomanian to early Campanian stages of the Late Cretaceous Period. It overlies the older Lohan Cura Formation and is itself overlain by the younger Allen Formation of the Malargüe Group, separated from both by unconformities, dated to 98 and 79 Ma respectively.

Description 
Deposits have been located in the provinces of Río Negro, Neuquén, and Mendoza. Although several different types of environments are represented in various sections of the Neuquén Group, the dominant regime is alluvial deposition. Many dinosaur and other fossil types have been discovered in these sediments.

Subdivision 
There are seven formations within the Neuquén Group. These are divided into three subgroups named after major rivers in the area. In some works, the subgroups themselves are treated as formations and what usually is considered to be the formations as mere members of these. However, particularly in the Río Limay Subgroup, the formations are clearly composed of very distinct rock layers.

Neuquén Group strata, ordered from youngest to oldest
 Río Colorado Subgroup (Santonian to early Campanian)
 Anacleto Formation (early Campanian)
 Bajo de la Carpa Formation (Santonian)
 Río Neuquén Subgroup (late Turonian to Coniacian)
 Plottier Formation (late Coniacian ?to early Santonian)
Sierra Barrosa Formation (middle Coniacian)
Los Bastos Formation (early Coniacian)
 Portezuelo Formation (late Turonian to earliest Coniacian)
Cerro Lisandro Formation (middle Turonian)
 Río Limay Subgroup (Cenomanian to early Turonian)
 Lisandro Formation (middle to late Turonian)
 Huincul Formation (late Cenomanian to early Turonian)
 Candeleros Formation (early Cenomanian)

South of Añelo, on the road between Lake Los Barreales and the Neuquén River are views on the successively younger formations, starting with the Lisandro Formation to the northwest of Lake Los Barreales, and finally crossing the Anacleto Formation about  down the road near the eastern tip of the lake. The older strata are exposed south of Lake Los Barreales.

See also 
 List of fossil sites
 Angostura Colorada Formation, Campanian to Maastrichtian fossiliferous formation of the North Patagonian Massif
 Asencio Formation, Campanian to Maastrichtian fossiliferous formation of the Paraná Basin
 Bajo Barreal Formation, Cenomanian to Turonian fossiliferous formation of the Golfo San Jorge Basin
 Bauru Group, Coniacian to Maastrichtian fossiliferous group of the Paraná Basin
 Cerro Fortaleza Formation, Cenomanian fossiliferous formation of the Austral Basin
 Colorado Formation, Campanian to Maastrichtian fossiliferous formation of the Colorado Basin
 Lago Colhué Huapí Formation, Campanian to Maastrichtian fossiliferous formation of the Golfo San Jorge Basin
 Los Blanquitos Formation, Campanian fossiliferous formation of the Salta Basin
 Mata Amarilla Formation, Albian to Santonian fossiliferous formation of the Austral Basin
 Santa Marta Formation, Santonian to Campanian fossiliferous formation of northern Antarctica

References

Bibliography 

 
 

 
Geologic formations of Argentina
Upper Cretaceous Series of South America
Cretaceous Argentina
Mapuche language